Cache is a city in Comanche County, Oklahoma, United States. The population was 2,796 at the 2010 census. It is an exurb included in the Lawton, Oklahoma Metropolitan Statistical Area. It is the location of Star House, the home of the Comanche chief Quanah Parker, the major leader of the Quahadi Comanche in the years of Indian Wars and transition to reservation life.

Geography

Demographics

As of the census of 2010, there were 2,796 people, 1,037 households, and 780 families residing in the city. The population density was 795.9 people per square mile (307.3/km2). There were 1,140 housing units at an average density of 324.5 per square mile (125.3/km2). The racial makeup of the city was 70.8% White, 2.5% African American, 18.6% Native American (13.45% Comanche), 0.4% Asian, 0.3% Pacific Islander, 0.09% from other races, and 6.5% from two or more races. Hispanic or Latino of any race were 6.1% of the population.

There were 1,037 households, out of which 42.3% had children under the age of 18 living with them, 52.1% were married couples living together, 16.0% had a female householder with no husband present, and 24.8% were non-families. 21.5% of all households were made up of individuals, and 8.0% had someone living alone who was 65 years of age or older. The average household size was 2.70 and the average family size was 3.10.

In the city, the population was spread out, with 28.1% under the age of 18, 9.0% from 18 to 24, 26.5% from 25 to 44, 24.0% from 45 to 64, and 11.3% who were 65 years of age or older. The median age was 33.2 years. For every 100 females, there were 95.8 males. For every 100 females age 18 and over, there were 92.6 males.

The median income for a household in the city was $41,220, and the median income for a family was $51,840. Males had a median income of $48,672 versus $33,051 for females. The per capita income for the city was $19,299. About 10.0% of families and 17.1% of the population were below the poverty line, including 19.5% of those under age 18 and 18.1% of those age 65 or over.

Government
Cache uses the Aldermanic model of municipal government. The city's primary authority resides in the City Council which approves ordinances, resolutions, and contracts. The city is divided into four wards with each ward electing a single city council representative for a four-year term. The mayor, who is elected every four years, presides and sets the agenda over the City Council is primarily ceremonial as a head of government. The mayor is the chief executive officer of the executive branch and has the power to prepare an annual budget, appoint heads of departments with city council confirmation, remove or suspend city employees, enforce city ordinances, and grant pardons for city violations with council approval.

At the federal level, Cache lies in Oklahoma 4th Congressional district, represented by Tom Cole. In the State Senate, Cache is in District 32 represented by Randy Bass. In the House, District 63 represented by Don Armes covers the city.

Historic Structures

There are multiple NRHP-listed places in Cache, including:
Quanah Parker Star House
Buffalo Lodge
Ingram House
Ferguson House
Boulder Cabin
Arrastra Site

See also
 Cache Public Schools

References

External links
 Cache Chamber of Commerce
 "Cache", Encyclopedia of Oklahoma History and Culture

Cities in Comanche County, Oklahoma
Cities in Oklahoma